Gridley is a city in Coffey County, Kansas, United States.  As of the 2020 census, the population of the city was 313.

History
Gridley was founded in about 1886.

The first post office in Gridley was established on June 23, 1886.

Geography
Gridley is located at  (38.099452, -95.884507).

Climate
The climate in this area is characterized by hot, humid summers and generally mild to cool winters.  According to the Köppen Climate Classification system, Gridley has a humid subtropical climate, abbreviated "Cfa" on climate maps.

Demographics

2010 census
As of the census of 2010, there were 341 people, 144 households, and 93 families residing in the city. The racial makeup of the city was 97.7% White, 0.9% African American, 0.3% Native American, 0.3% from other races, and 0.9% from two or more races. Hispanic or Latino of any race were 0.3% of the population.

There were 144 households, of which 31.3% had children under the age of 18 living with them, 52.8% were married couples living together, 7.6% had a female householder with no husband present, 4.2% had a male householder with no wife present, and 35.4% were non-families. 32.6% of all households were made up of individuals, and 17.4% had someone living alone who was 65 years of age or older. The average household size was 2.37 and the average family size was 2.98.

The median age in the city was 37.9 years. 26.7% of residents were under the age of 18; 9.3% were between the ages of 18 and 24; 20.9% were from 25 to 44; 24.7% were from 45 to 64; and 18.5% were 65 years of age or older. The gender makeup of the city was 49.3% male and 50.7% female.

2000 census
As of the census of 2000, there were 372 people, 158 households, and 106 families residing in the city. The racial makeup of the city was 96.77% White, 0.81% African American, 0.54% Native American, 0.27% Asian, 0.27% from other races, and 1.34% from two or more races. Hispanic or Latino of any race were 0.81% of the population.

There were 158 households, out of which 26.6% had children under the age of 18 living with them, 58.9% were married couples living together, 5.1% had a female householder with no husband present, and 32.3% were non-families. 26.6% of all households were made up of individuals, and 18.4% had someone living alone who was 65 years of age or older. The average household size was 2.35 and the average family size was 2.86.

In the city, the population was spread out, with 26.1% under the age of 18, 5.4% from 18 to 24, 22.6% from 25 to 44, 21.8% from 45 to 64, and 24.2% who were 65 years of age or older. The median age was 42 years. For every 100 females, there were 100.0 males. For every 100 females age 18 and over, there were 92.3 males.

The median income for a household in the city was $26,346, and the median income for a family was $40,313. Males had a median income of $25,694 versus $19,375 for females. The per capita income for the city was $18,805. About 7.9% of families and 10.7% of the population were below the poverty line, including 3.4% of those under age 18 and 16.1% of those age 65 or over.

Education
Gridley is served by USD 245 Southern Coffey County. School unification consolidated Gridley and LeRoy schools forming USD 245 in 2003. The Southern Coffey County High School mascot is Titans.

Gridley High School was closed through school unification. The Gridley High School mascot was Gridley Yellow Jackets.

References

Further reading

External links
 City of Gridley
 Gridley - Directory of Public Officials
 USD 245, local school district
 Gridley city map, KDOT

Cities in Kansas
Cities in Coffey County, Kansas